The 2006 American Handball Women's Youth Championships took place in Blumenau from August 29 – September 2.

Results

Final standing

References 
 brasilhandebol.com.br

2006 in handball
Pan American Women's Youth Handball Championship
2006 in youth sport